1 Canadian Air Division (1 Cdn Air Div) is the operational-level command and control formation of the Royal Canadian Air Force (RCAF). Prior to 2006 the official abbreviation for the division was 1 CAD. It is commanded by an air force major-general.

History

Timeline 

 1952: No. 1 Air Division (RCAF) activated, with 4 wings. Equipped with the Canadair Sabre, in 1956 the CF-100 and in 1962 the CF-104.
 1967: No. 1 Canadian Air Group (1 CAG) takes the place No. 1 Air Division (RCAF) after RCAF leaves France.
 1968: The unified Canadian Armed Forces is created and No. 1 Canadian Air Group is reduced to 1 Wing and 4 Wing.
 1969: No. 1 Canadian Air Group is reduced to 4 Wing.
 1970: 4 Wing becomes 1 Canadian Air Group (CAG). Equipped with CF-5 in 1970 and CF-18 in 1982.
 1988: 1 Canadian Air Group is reorganized as No. 1 Canadian Air Division
 1993: As the Canadian Armed Forces prepares to close their European bases, No. 1 Canadian Air Division stands down.
 1997: 1 Canadian Air Division is reactivated in Winnipeg.

Formation (1952–1967) 
The division traces its origins to the activation of Headquarters No. 1 Air Division, Royal Canadian Air Force in Paris, France, on 1 October 1952. Air Division headquarters relocated to  Metz, France in April 1953.  
No. 1 Air Division was established to meet Canada's NATO air defence commitments in Europe. It consisted of four wings of twelve fighter squadrons located at four bases. Two bases were located in France (RCAF Station Marville (No. 1 Wing) and RCAF Station Grostenquin (No. 2 Wing)) and two were located in West Germany (RCAF Station Zweibrücken (No. 3 Wing) and RCAF Station Baden-Soellingen (No. 4 Wing)). (No. 1 Wing was first located at RCAF North Luffenham, England and was moved to Marville some time after October, 1954). These wings were part of a group of bases which also included U.S. and French installations, all of which came under the jurisdiction of NATO's Fourth Allied Tactical Air Force (4 ATAF) which, in turn, was commanded by Allied Air Forces Central Europe (AAFCE). Components located in Metz included  Air Division Headquarters, an air traffic control centre, a telecommunications centre, a combat operations centre, and a support unit. From 1952 to 1963 the RCAF operated the 30 Air Materiel Base, at RCAF Langar (RAF Langar) in Nottinghamshire.  RCAF Langar was Canada's last base in the U.K. and served as a primary supply station for No. 1 Air Division RCAF in Europe.

Canadian squadrons were originally equipped with Canadair Sabre day fighters. Flying the Sabre, 1 Canadian Air Division built up to a strength of 12 squadrons flying a total of 300 fighters. Subsequently, the Sabres in one squadron of each wing were replaced by the all-weather CF-100 in 1956. The eight remaining Sabre squadrons were replaced by (nuclear) strike/reconnaissance CF-104 Starfighters in 1962 while the four CF-100 squadrons were withdrawn. "In the early 1960s, France assumed a greater role in its own defences and 2 Wing along with its sister wings were again disbanded on August 1, 1964."

Reorganization (1967–1993) 
After the RCAF left France in 1967 and after the RCAF was reorganized and consolidated with Canada's other two services, No. 1 Air Division was replaced by No. 1 Canadian Air Group (1 CAG) with headquarters at CFB Lahr, West Germany. The initial eight squadrons flying the CF-104 within 1 Canadian air division were incrementally reduced, first to six and then down to three squadrons, contributing to the reduction from air division to air wing/group strength. This was largely due to a high attrition rate for the CF-104. While a total of 238 single-seat and dual-seat aircraft were built for the RCAF, 113 Canadian aircraft were lost during the 24 year era of the Starfighter and 37 pilots died.

As an austerity measure, in 1968, No. 3 Wing Zweibrücken was relocated to Canada (Bagotville) and its two squadrons were moved to No. 1 Wing and 4 Wing. 1969 brought the announcement that the amalgamation of the Canadian Forces in Europe to one command and two bases, and that the Canadian army in northern Germany (Soest area) would be moving south to Nos. 1 Wing and 4 Wing. This meant that No. 1 Wing Lahr would close its doors and the air force in Europe would be reduced in strength (from 6 to 3 squadrons) and concentrated at Baden-Soellingen; the new name would be 1 Canadian Air Group (CAG). The close out parade was held at Baden in the arena on June 29, 1970.  This was the change date from 4 Wing to 1 CAG.  It was also the disbanding date for two of the squadrons.

The Group remained until 1988 when Canada increased its commitment to NATO (three squadrons in theatre and two squadrons in Canada) and No. 1 Canadian Air Division stood-up again. However, shortly after this, relations with the east started to warm and Canada made another announcement: Canada would withdraw its forces stationed in Europe and close the doors on its two bases by 1994. The Air Division, reduced to three squadrons then to two and finally one, ceased flying operations 1 January 1993. This ended a major era of Canada's Air Force.

Recent history (1997–present)
In the summer of 1997, the functional groups (Air Transport Group, Fighter Group, Maritime Air Group, Air Reserve Group, and 10 Tactical Air Group) were dissolved, and 14 Training Group was absorbed within Air Command Headquarters. 1 Canadian Air Division was stood up in Winnipeg to exercise operational command of all CF air assets.

Today based in Winnipeg, Manitoba, the division is also the headquarters for the Canadian NORAD Region (CANR), commands 11 of the RCAF's 13 wings, and oversees the monitoring of Canada's airspace in support of the nation's commitments to the North American Aerospace Defence Command (NORAD). The division is staffed by 600 regular and reserve force members.  In addition to military personnel the headquarters is also assisted by civilian personnel in the Operational Research and Analysis Directorate (ORAD).

Structure

Order of battle, 1989 
 No. 1 Canadian Air Division, CFB Baden–Soellingen, in war under Fourth Allied Tactical Air Force
 3 Wing CFB Lahr
 3 Wing Operations
 3 Communication and Air Traffic Control Squadron
 416 Tactical Fighter Squadron or 441 Tactical Fighter Squadron from CFB Cold Lake,  CF-18 
 425 Tactical Fighter Squadron or 433 Tactical Fighter Squadron from CFB Bagotville, 18× CF-18
 4 Wing CFB Baden-Söllingen
 4 Wing Operations
 4 Communication and Air Traffic Control Squadron
 409 Tactical Fighter Squadron, 18× CF-18
 421 Tactical Fighter Squadron, 18× CF-18
 439 Tactical Fighter Squadron, 18× CF-18
 Air Reserve Augmentation Flight (Reserve Pilots)
 Training Flight, 5× CT-133 Silver Star
 1 Air Maintenance Squadron CFB Baden-Soellingen
 4 Construction Engineer Squadron, detached from Royal Canadian Engineers
 444 Tactical Helicopter Squadron (detached to 4 Canadian Mechanized Brigade Group), CFB Lahr (CH-136 Kiowa, Bell UH-1N Twin Huey)
 Detachment Lahr, 412 Transport Squadron, 2× CC-142 Dash 8
 5 Air Movement Unit

Commanders 

 Major-General George Macdonald (1996–1998)
 Major-General Lloyd Campbell (1998–2000)
 Major-General Steve Lucas (2000–2002)
 Major-General Marc Dumais (Jul 2002 - Aug 2004)
 Major-General Charles Bouchard (Aug 2004 – Jul 2007)
 Major-General Marcel Duval (Jul 2007 – Jul 2009)
 Major-General Yvan Blondin (Jul 2009 – Jul 2011)
 Major-General Alain Parent (Jul 2011 – Jul 2012)
 Major-General Pierre St-Amand (Jul 2012 – Jul 2014) 
 Major-General David Wheeler (Jul 2014 - Jun 2016)
 Major-General Christian Drouin (Jun 2016 – May 2019)
 Major-General Alain Pelletier (May 2019 - Jul 2020)
 Major-General Eric Kenny (Jul 2020 - Jul 2022)
 Major-General Iain Huddleston (Jul 2022–present)

References 

 Greenhous, Brereton; Halliday, Hugh A. Canada's Air Forces, 1914–1999. Montreal: Editions Art Global and the Department of National Defence, 1999. .

External links
 
  Tactical Air Control System NATO Ground Environment Command & Control US Air Force, Europe (usarmygermany.com)

Canadian air divisions
Military units and formations established in 1983